Mun In-Guk (born September 29, 1978) is a North Korean international football player.

Mun has made 25 appearances for the Korea DPR national football team in FIFA World Cup qualifying rounds.

Goals for senior national team

References 

1978 births
Living people
People from Nampo
North Korea international footballers
North Korean footballers
April 25 Sports Club players
2010 FIFA World Cup players
2011 AFC Asian Cup players
Footballers at the 2006 Asian Games
Association football midfielders
Asian Games competitors for North Korea